Herron Berrian (born 31 December 1994, Liberia) is a Liberian football player who plays as an attacking midfielder for  Panserraikos.

References

External links

1994 births
Living people
Liberian footballers
Association football forwards
Liberia international footballers
Liberian expatriate footballers
Sportspeople from Monrovia